John Jenkins (20 March 1892 – 16 April 1946) was a Welsh international footballer who made 216 Football League appearances playing as a full back for Brighton & Hove Albion.

Life and career
Jenkins was born in Gwersyllt, Denbighshire, and began his football career with Mold Town. Over the next 15 years he played for numerous clubs in Wales, including Mardy and Pontypridd of the Southern League, and made wartime appearances for Portsmouth and Cardiff City, before joining Brighton & Hove Albion of the Football League Third Division South in 1922 at the age of 30. He was a regular in the team for several years, and in his last season, 1927–28, he still played 22 matches. After his retirement as a player, he ran a pub in Brighton, and died in the town in 1946 aged 54.

Jenkins was capped eight times for Wales. He had taken part in a trial match in 1912, but did not win his first cap until 16 February 1924 in a 2–0 defeat of Scotland. Jenkins appeared in all three matches as Wales won the 1923–24 British Home Championship. His eighth and last appearance was also against Scotland, on 30 October 1926, and set a Brighton club record for international caps that lasted until Mark Lawrenson made his ninth appearance for the Republic of Ireland more than 50 years later.

See also
 List of Wales international footballers (alphabetical)

References

1892 births
1946 deaths
Sportspeople from Denbighshire
Welsh footballers
Wales international footballers
Association football fullbacks
Mardy A.F.C. players
Wrexham A.F.C. players
Pontypridd F.C. players
Brighton & Hove Albion F.C. players
Southern Football League players
English Football League players
Cardiff City F.C. wartime guest players
Portsmouth F.C. wartime guest players